The Edward M. Blackburn House, near Midway, Kentucky, was built around 1810.  It was listed on the National Register of Historic Places in 1985.

It is a one-and-a-half-story Federal style brick house.  Its main mass is five bays wide, and there are flanking one-room extensions and a rear ell.  Its front entrance is a Palladian doorway with a fanlight.

It has also been known as Equira and later as Hurstland Farm.

It is located in Woodford County, Kentucky on Spring Station Rd.

References

National Register of Historic Places in Woodford County, Kentucky
Federal architecture in Kentucky
Houses completed in 1810
Houses in Woodford County, Kentucky
Houses on the National Register of Historic Places in Kentucky
1810 establishments in Kentucky